The Mid Ocean Club is a private 6,520 yard, 18-hole golf course in Tucker's Town, Bermuda. Designed by Charles Blair Macdonald in 1921, and originally built in collaboration with the Furness Bermuda Line. It was modified to its current design in 1953 by Robert Trent Jones. It is consistently placed highly among world courses and is ranked 45th by Golf Digest for courses outside the United States. The Mid Ocean Club hosted its second PGA Grand Slam of Golf in October 2008. Previously, the tournament had its home at Poipu Bay Golf Course in Hawaii.

The Mid Ocean Club  has hosted George H. W. Bush, Winston Churchill, Dwight Eisenhower, and the Duke of Windsor. Some of the more well-known holes include the par-3 "Redan" 17th hole, the par-4 18th hole, as well as the signature par-4 5th.
Ian Fleming mentions the club in his James Bond short story Quantum of Solace, describing the course as a "fine links where all the quality play and get together at the club afterwards for gossip and drinks".

References

External links
Official site
PGA Grand Slam of Golf

Golf clubs and courses in Bermuda
Golf clubs and courses designed by Charles B. Macdonald
St. George's Parish, Bermuda
Hotels in Bermuda